Zevenbergen is a railway station located in Zevenbergen, Netherlands. The station was opened in 1854, and is located on the Antwerp–Lage Zwaluwe railway. The train services are operated by Nederlandse Spoorwegen, with plans for possible additional service in the future.

Destinations

From Zevenbergen train departs for Dordrecht and Roosendaal.

There are also busses going the following lines: 117 Line to Breda CS/ Fijnaart on Saturday it only goes to Klundert.

Line 119: Going to Breda CS/ Zevenbergen Station.

Train services
The following services currently call at Zevenbergen:
2x/hour local service (sprinter) Dordrecht - Roosendaal

Railway stations in North Brabant
Railway stations opened in 1854
Transport in Moerdijk
1854 establishments in the Netherlands
Railway stations in the Netherlands opened in the 19th century